Football was contested for men only at the 1962 Central American and Caribbean Games in Kingston, Jamaica.

The gold medal was won by Netherlands Antilles for the third time, who earned 10 points and finished the tournament unbeaten.

Participating teams

Table 
A 2 point system used.

Results

Statistics

Goalscorers

References

External links
 

1962 Central American and Caribbean Games
1962